The following outline is provided as an overview of and topical guide to psychology:

Psychology refers to the study of subconscious and conscious activities, such as emotions and thoughts. It is a field of study that bridges the scientific and social sciences and has a huge reach. Its goal is to comprehend individuals and groups by both establishing general principles and researching specific cases. Psychology is the study of people and the reasons for their behavior. It has grown in popularity in the last few decades and is now an undergraduate course at many universities. 

There are a variety of psychology branches that people specialize in, as outlined below.

Branches of psychology

Subdisciplines of psychology

List of psychology disciplines

Basic psychological science
 Abnormal psychology
 Applied psychology
 Asian psychology
 Behavioral genetics
 Biological psychology
 Black psychology
 Clinical neuropsychology
 Cognitive psychology
 Comparative psychology
 Conservation psychology
 Criminal psychology
 Critical psychology
 Cultural psychology
 Developmental psychology
 Differential psychology
 Evolutionary psychology
 Experimental psychology
 Forensic developmental psychology
 Group psychology
 Health psychology
 Indigenous psychology
 Mathematical psychology
 Medical psychology
 Motivation
 Music psychology
 Neuropsychology
 Pediatric psychology
 Personality psychology
 Positive psychology
 Psychopharmacology
 Quantitative psychology
 Rehabilitation psychology
 Social psychology
 Transpersonal psychology

Other areas by topic
 Behavioral economics
 Child psychopathology
 Feminine psychology
 Indian psychology
 Intelligence
 Moral psychology
 Psychometrics
 Psycholinguistics
 Psychology of art
 Psychology of religion
 Psychology of science
 Psychology of self
 Self
 Psychopathology
 Psychopharmacology and substance abuse
 Psychophysics
 Sex and psychology

Applied psychology
 Anomalistic psychology
 Applied behavior analysis
 Clinical psychology
 Community psychology
 Consumer psychology
 Counseling psychology
 Ecological psychology
 Educational psychology
 Environmental psychology
 Forensic psychology
 Health psychology
 Human factors psychology
 Industrial and organizational psychology
 Legal psychology
 Media psychology
 Military psychology
 Occupational psychology
 Occupational health psychology
 Political psychology
 Psychoneuroimmunology
 Psychopharmacology
 School psychology
 Sport psychology
 Traffic psychology

Psychological schools

Psychological schools – some examples of psychological schools follow (the most prominent schools are in bold):
 Analytical psychology
 Behaviorism (see also Radical behaviourism)
 Cognitivism
 Depth psychology
 Descriptive psychology
 Ecological systems theory
 Ego psychology
 Enactivism (psychology)
 Existential psychology
 Functional psychology
 Gestalt psychology
 Humanistic psychology
 Individual differences
 Individual psychology
 Phenomenological psychology
 Psychoanalysis
 Structuralism
 Transactional analysis
 Transpersonal psychology

History of psychology

History of psychology
 Timeline of psychology
 Timeline of psychotherapy

Psychology theories 

 List of social psychology theories

Research methods

List of psychological research methods
 List of neurological research methods

Psychological phenomena 

 Cognitive biases
 Emotion (list)
 Memory biases
 Perception (index)
 Psychological effects
 Thought
 List of thought processes
 List of organizational thought processes
 List of decision-making processes
 List of creative thought processes
 List of mnemonics
 Emotional intelligence

Psychological conditions 

 DSM-IV Codes
 DSM-IV Codes (alphabetical)
 List of mental disorders
 List of mood disorders
 List of neurological disorders
 Outline of autism

Psychological treatments 

 List of cognitive–behavioral therapies
 List of therapies
 List of psychotherapies

Medicine 

 List of psychotropic medications
 List of psychedelic drugs
 List of psychiatric medications
 List of psychiatric medications by condition treated
 List of neurosteroids
 List of nootropics (smart drugs)
 List of drugs

Psychology education 

 List of credentials in psychology
 List of schools of psychoanalysis

Psychology organizations 

 List of psychology organizations
 Evolutionary psychology research groups and centers
 List of schools of psychoanalysis

Psychology publications 

 List of further reading on Borderline personality disorder
 List of psychology journals

Scholars of psychology (and related) 

List of psychologists
 List of clinical psychologists
 List of comparative psychologists
 List of cognitive psychologists
 List of developmental psychologists
 List of educational psychologists
 List of evolutionary psychologists
 List of social psychologists

Related
 List of cognitive scientists
 List of fictional psychiatrists
 List of neurologists and neurosurgeons
 List of neuroscientists
 List of psychiatrists
 List of psychoanalytical theorists

See also 

 Index of psychology articles
 Index of cognitive science articles
 Index of neurobiology articles
 Index of psychometric articles
 List of neuroscience topics
 List of counseling topics
 List of neuroimaging software
 List of regions in the human brain
 Web-based experiments
 Neuro-linguistic programming (index)

References

External links

 Psychology Library- Search Psychology articles by author's name, category and key word (Also Articles from the American Psychological Association)

Psychology
Psychology
 
 1